In March 15, 1972 a by-election was held in for the Murshidabad seat in the Lok Sabha (lower house of the parliament of India). The by-election was called after the death of the sitting Member of Parliament Chowdhury Abu Taleb.

The election was won by Muhammad Khoda Baksh of the Indian National Congress (I).

References

Lok Sabha by-elections
1972 elections in India
Elections in West Bengal
1970s in West Bengal
Murshidabad district